Tachina Peeters (Bonheiden, 27 May 1997) is a Belgian gymnast, active in tumbling. She is the 2021 European Champion tumbling

References

Living people
1997 births
Female trampolinists
Belgian gymnasts
People from Bonheiden
Sportspeople from Antwerp Province
20th-century Belgian women
21st-century Belgian women